Gregory Arkhurst (born 6 May 1976) is an Olympic swimmer from Côte d'Ivoire. He represented his country at the 2000 and 2004 Summer Olympics, while living and training in Canada, however.

2000
Arkhurst swam in the 100 metre freestyle in 2000, finishing 63rd out of 74 total swimmers.

2004
In 2004, he swam in the 50 metre freestyle, finishing 58th out of 86 total swimmers.

External links
 Info Yahoo!.com

1976 births
Living people
Ivorian male freestyle swimmers
Swimmers at the 2000 Summer Olympics
Swimmers at the 2004 Summer Olympics
Olympic swimmers of Ivory Coast